Phai can refer to:
Phai people, an ethnic group in Thailand and Laos
Phai language, the language of the Phai people
phai (unit), a former Siamese measure of mass and a subdivision of the Siamese tical currency